The 1931 Baltic Cup was held in Tallinn, Estonia at Kadrioru staadion from 30 August to 1 September 1931. It was the fourth time three Baltic countries — Estonia, Latvia and Lithuania — came together to play a friendly tournament and determine the best team amongst them. Estonia won the tournament, beating both opponents.

This was the first time the competition was known as the Baltic Cup.

Results

Scorers
2 goals
  Friedrich Karm
  Eduard Ellman-Eelma

1 goal
  Leonhard Kass
  Ēriks Pētersons
  Jānis Škincs

References

External links
 Tournament overview at EU-Football.info

1928
1931–32 in European football
1931 in Lithuanian football
1931 in Latvian football
1931 in Estonian football
1931